Atlanta quoyii is a species of sea snail, a holoplanktonic marine gastropod mollusk in the family Atlantidae.

Description

Distribution
This marine species occurs in the Gulf of Mexico.

References

 Rosenberg, G., F. Moretzsohn, and E. F. García. 2009. Gastropoda (Mollusca) of the Gulf of Mexico, Pp. 579–699 in Felder, D.L. and D.K. Camp (eds.), Gulf of Mexico–Origins, Waters, and Biota. Biodiversity. Texas A&M Press, College Station, Texas.

Atlantidae
Gastropods described in 1850
Taxa named by John Edward Gray